Le Crabe-tambour (Drummer-Crab) is a 1977 film directed by Pierre Schoendoerffer based on the novel he published in 1976. The title character played by Jacques Perrin is based on the famous French Navy officer Pierre Guillaume.

Cast
 Jean Rochefort as Captain
 Claude Rich as Pierre
 Aurore Clément as Aurore
 Odile Versois
 Pierre Rousseau
 Jacques Dufilho as Chef
 Jacques Perrin as Lt. Willsdorf, "le crabe-Tambour"
 Jean Champion - (uncredited)
 François Dyrek - (uncredited)
 Bernard La Jarrige - (uncredited)
 François Landolf - (uncredited)
 Hubert Laurent - (uncredited)
 Joseph Momo - (uncredited)
 Yves Morgan-Jones - (uncredited)

Awards and nominations
César Awards (France)
Won: Best Actor – Leading Role (Jean Rochefort)
Won: Best Actor – Supporting Role (Jacques Dufilho)
Won: Best Cinematography (Raoul Coutard)
Nominated: Best Director (Pierre Schoendoerffer)
Nominated: Best Film
Nominated: Best Music (Philippe Sarde)

References

External links
 IMDb entry

1977 films
French war drama films
Algerian War films
Films directed by Pierre Schoendoerffer
Films featuring a Best Actor César Award-winning performance
Films featuring a Best Supporting Actor César Award-winning performance
Films set in the French colonial empire
Seafaring films
Films scored by Philippe Sarde
1970s French-language films
1970s French films
1970s war drama films